This is a list of North American nations ranked by Gross Domestic Product (GDP) at Purchasing Power Parity (PPP). Figures are given in 2021 International Dollars according to International Monetary Fund 2020 figures.

See also
 Economic growth
 Economic reports
 List of North American countries by GDP (nominal)

References

North America
GDP
GDP
GDP